Monster Island  is a 2019 television science-fiction monster film produced by The Asylum. Keeping with The Asylum's mainstay theme of mockbusters, it was released in the same year as the 2019 monster film Godzilla: King of the Monsters.

Monster Island first premiered on June 1, 2019 on the Syfy channel, exactly one day after Godzilla: King of the Monsters.

Plot
A team of geologists collaborate with the New Zealand Coast Guard in fighting against two kaiju in battle with one another: a giant starfish dubbed Tengu that spawns dragon-like offspring, and the golem-like Walking Mountain.

Cast
 Eric Roberts as General Horne
 Toshi Toda as Lieutenant Maxwell  
 Adrian Bouchet as Billy Ford  
 Natalie Robbie as Sarah Murray  
 Chris Fisher as Riley James  
 Jonathan Pienaar as Captain Mato  
 Margot Wood as Rena Hangaroa  
 Meghan Oberholzer as Susan Meyerhold  
 Ryan Kruger as Navigator Thompson  
 Lindsay Sullivan as Captain Hansen

Production
Monster Island was filmed in Cape Town, South Africa; Los Angeles, California; and New Zealand.

Release
Monster Island aired twice in its television premiere on June 1, 2019. Exactly twelve days later, it was released on DVD on June 13. Three months later, Monster Island was available on SVOD on September 13.

Reception
Phil Wheat of Nerdly said of the film: "I'm not going to lie, this is yet another low-budget CGI-filled film from The Asylum and if you don’t like that sort of thing you’re not going to like this. But… but, if you're like me and live for these cheesy, gloriously over-the-top, B-movies then there's a LOT to recommend about Monster Island."

References

External links
 Monster Island on The Asylum website 
 

Kaiju films
Giant monster films
2019 television films
2019 films
American monster movies
2010s English-language films
Films set on islands
Mockbuster films
The Asylum films
Films directed by Mark Atkins
2010s American films
2010s Japanese films